Alexandros Papamichail (born 18 September 1988 in Karditsa) is a Greek racewalker. He competed in the 20 km walk at the 2012 Summer Olympics, where he placed 15th with a time of 1:21:12, a Greek national record. At the 2012 Olympic Games, he was also 22nd in the 50 km walk event setting one more national record.

The following year, he took the 16th place (20 km) at the World Championships in Moscow, while at the 2014 European Championships in Zurich, he was 13th (50 km).

He competed in both race walking distances at the 2016 Summer Olympics.

Competition record

References

External links
 

1988 births
Living people
Athletes from Karditsa
Greek male racewalkers
Olympic athletes of Greece
Athletes (track and field) at the 2012 Summer Olympics
Athletes (track and field) at the 2016 Summer Olympics
World Athletics Championships athletes for Greece
Athletes (track and field) at the 2009 Mediterranean Games
Mediterranean Games competitors for Greece
Athletes (track and field) at the 2020 Summer Olympics
20th-century Greek people
21st-century Greek people